Tsai Chin may refer to:

 Tsai Chin (actress) (born 1933), actress from Shanghai, also known as Irene Chow
 Tsai Chin (singer) (born 1957), Taiwanese singer